The Blazing Sun is a 1950 American Western film directed by John English and starring Gene Autry, Lynne Roberts, and Anne Gwynne.

Plot
Gene Autry is a private investigator for a banking association, on the trail of two bank robbers, Al Bartlett and Trot Lucas. Bartlett and Lucas waylay Larry Taylor, a doctor on his way to the town of White Water to treat a train engineer who was wounded by the bank robbers, and Taylor's assistant, Helen Ellis. Stealing the couple's horses, they leave them stranded.

Autry rides out from White Water heading towards Los Robles, where the doctor was summoned from, to see what is keeping him. Coming upon the couple, he lets Larry ride Champion, Autry's horse, into White Water to get help, while he stays with Helen for protection. Larry returns shortly and the three ride into White Water.

In Los Robles, Helen's father, a prospector, enlists the help of a local assayer, Ben Luber, to evaluate the quality of some ore he has extracted. Ben tells Tom Ellis that he will need mining equipment to mine the ore, and his willing to lend him the money for it, in exchange for an interest in the mine. Ben and his brother, Carl, are partners with Bartlett and Lucas. When they go up to the hideout of the two bank robbers, they see Autry approaching, trying to track down the two bandits. Ben releases the two horses which were stolen from Doc Taylor and Helen, which Autry takes off after. Ben and Carl follow, and overpower Autry, who they accuse of stealing the horses, and take him into Los Robles. Autry is quickly cleared, and enlists the help of an old friend, Mike, to continue the search outside of town for Bartlett and Lucas. While camping out that night, they see Ben driving back into town late at night.

The following day, Autry publicly confronts Ben about his trip the previous night. Flustered, Ben makes up a story about two of his horses being stolen (which he has actually taken up to Lucas and Bartlett). When Sheriff Phillips raises a posse to go after the non-existent thieves, Ben sends them in the wrong direction. When Autry refuses to join the posse, Phillips has him put in jail for safe-keeping,  until the posse returns. However, Bartlett robs the town's bank since the sheriff is away, and Helen witnesses it and follows him to his hideout in the hills.

Autry is released from jail, so he can track the bank robber. He arrives at Bartlett's cabin in the hills just as Helen is discovered. In the ensuing gunfight Bartlett kills his brother and Lucas, thinking that his dead brother's body will pass for him. When Kitty shows up to identify Bartlett's body, claiming to be his wife, Autry figures out that the dead man is not Bartlett.

Ben, knowing where Bartlett is now hiding out, offers to turn him in for the reward, but Bartlett figures out the doublecross and kills Ben. Autry and Tom Ellis ride after Bartlett, catching up to him as he boards a train in an attempt to escape. Bartlett is killed, and Autry allows Helen and Tom to have the reward money.

Cast list
 Gene Autry as Gene Autry
 Champion 
 Lynne Roberts as Helen Ellis
 Anne Gwynne as Kitty
 Edward Norris as Doc Larry Taylor
 Kenne Duncan as Al Bartlett
 Alan Hale Jr. as Ben Luber
 Gregg Barton as Trot Lucas
 Steve Darrell as Sheriff Phillips
 Tom London as Tom Ellis
 Pat Buttram as Mike
 Sandy Sanders as Carl Luber

Production
On January 15, 1950, Gene Autry announced that he would begin filming the first of his scheduled six films for Columbia with The Blazing Sun, commencing production on March 27. John Englund was given the nod to direct in April. Despite the earlier announcement, the filming did not begin until the end of April. After it opened, the National Legion of Decency gave it an "A" rating: "morally unobjectionable for general patronage.

Reception
Motion Picture Daily (MPD) gave the film a somewhat favorable review, enjoying Autry's performance, and complimenting the rest of the cast on their acting. They felt it would please his fans, but was a bit short on action, however when the action did come it was well done and very realistic. Variety enjoyed the film slightly more, saying it compared favorably with more run-of-the-mill "oaters" (a film industry term for Westerns). Unlike MPD, they felt the picture stressed action more so than Autry's other films. They singled out the work of the supporting cast, in particular enjoying the performances of Kenne Duncan, Pat Buttram, Lynne Roberts, Edward Norris, and Alan Hale Jr.. They praised English's direction, complimenting his handling of the action, as well as the camerawork of William Bradford.

References

External links
 
 
 

American black-and-white films
Columbia Pictures films
American Western (genre) films
1950 Western (genre) films
1950 films
Films directed by John English
Films with screenplays by Jack Townley
1950s English-language films
1950s American films